The Saxony Football Association (SFV), is the umbrella organization of the football clubs in the German state Saxony and covers 13 football districts. The SFV was founded in 1990 and has its headquarters in Leipzig. President of the association is Klaus Reichenbach.

The SFV belongs to the Northeastern German Football Association and is one of 21 state organizations of the German Football Association (German: Deutscher Fussball-Bund - DFB).

In 2017, the SFV had 152,902 members from 908 football clubs with 6,431 teams.

References

External links
 SFV website 

Football in Saxony
Football governing bodies in Germany
1990 establishments in Germany